Channar or Channan was a surname used in Kerala until the early 20th century by families of the ezhava caste. The same surname is also being used by Jatt clans. Along with Panicker, Vaidyar and Thandar families, Channar families were high status ezhavas with caste privileges. Yenathinathar, a saivite saint and chola military general had this surname.

References

Indian surnames
Ezhava